Countess Walburga Douglas (born 5 October 1958), née Walburga Habsburg-Lothringen, is a German-born Swedish lawyer and politician, who served as a member of the Riksdag of Sweden for the Moderate Party from 2006 to 2014. She is the vice-president of the Paneuropean Union and a board member of the Institute for Information on the Crimes of Communism.

Early life

Born in 1958 in Berg am Starnberger See, Germany, she is the fifth daughter of Otto von Habsburg, last crown prince of Austria-Hungary, and of Princess Regina of Saxe-Meiningen. She was baptized under the given names Walburga Maria Franziska Helene Elisabeth.

At the time of her birth, her father was stateless, domiciled in Germany on a Spanish diplomatic passport. Walburga was banished from the Republic of Austria from birth and well into adult life, along with her siblings, by the Habsburg Law that had been in effect since 1938, having been (re)imposed by the Nazis. The Austrian Republic was forced to repeal the banishment of Walburga and her family, which was found to violate their human rights, as a precondition for admission to the European Union.

She is a granddaughter of the last Austrian emperor, Charles I, and a member of the House of Habsburg-Lorraine. Her ancestral titles (by now abolished) are Archduchess Walburga of Austria, Archduchess of Austria, Princess of Hungary and Bohemia, with the style of Her Imperial and Royal Highness (HI&RH). Her family used the traditional titles as titles of pretense during their exile in Germany when she was a child. She does not currently use her ancestral titles actively in her daily life; however by law she holds the title Countess Douglas in the Kingdom of Sweden, her current country of residence and citizenship.

Career

Professional career

After her Abitur graduation in 1977 in Tutzing, Bavaria, she studied canonical law to the doctoral level in Salzburg. From 1979 to 1992 she worked as an assistant at the European Parliament. In 1983 she studied at the National Journalism Center in Washington, D.C., and worked at the office of Reader's Digest in the same city. She worked for the Ministry of Information of the Sultanate of Oman from 1985 to 1992, and in 2004 she became a member of the board of the Arab International Media Forum in London.

Political career
In 1973 she co-founded Paneuropa-Jugend Deutschland, and was its chairperson in Bavaria, and vice chairperson on the national level. In 1977 she founded Brüsewitz-Zentrum (Christlich-Paneuropäisches Studienwerk). From 1980 to 1988 she was assistant international Secretary General of the international Paneuropean Union, 1988 to 2004 she was its secretary general and she is its executive vice chairperson since 2004.

She was one of the organisers of the Paneuropa-Picknick at the Iron Curtain on the 19 August 1989, on the border between Hungary and Austria. At this occasion, the fence was opened for the first time, letting more than 660 Germans from the GDR escape from the east. This was the largest number of escapees since the Berlin Wall was built and is seen by many as one of the main symbols of the fall of Eastern European Communism.

Since 2003 she is the chairperson of the local branch of the Swedish Moderate Party in Flen and on the board of the regional organisation of the party in Södermanland. She is a member of the board of the Jarl Hjalmarson Foundation since 2005, a foundation closely linked to the Moderate Party.

In 1999 and 2004 she ran for the European Parliament for the Moderate Party, in 2002 and 2006 she ran for the national parliament (riksdagen). She was elected,  17 September 2006 to the Swedish Parliament, in an election which showed the greatest support for the Moderate Party since 1928. Vice-president of the OSCE Parliamentary Assemby and Head of the Swedish Parliamentary delegation to the OSCE since 2011. She has to give up her seat in the Riksdag in 2014 due to the heavy losses of her party, after eight years as a member of parliament.

She is a board member of the Institute for Information on the Crimes of Communism.

Personal life

Walburga married the Swedish Count Carl Axel Archibald Douglas (born 27 November 1949 in Stockholm), son of Count Archibald Douglas and Baroness Margareta Lagerfelt, on 5 December 1992 in Budapest, Hungary. Her husband's family is a  noble family in Sweden, descended from the Scot Robert Douglas, Count of Skenninge, member of the Scottish Clan Douglas and founder of its Swedish branch. The family's comital title, conferred by Queen Christina of Sweden in 1654, is legally recognized in the country.. Her husband is a first cousin of Princess Elisabeth, Duchess in Bavaria, the wife of Prince Max, Duke in Bavaria, and her siblings Rosita Spencer-Churchill, Duchess of Marlborough, and Count Gustaf Douglas, and a first cousin once removed of Sophie, Hereditary Princess of Liechtenstein, née Duchess in Bavaria.

They have a son, Count Mauritz Otto Wenzel Douglas (born 30 March 1994 in Stockholm). They live at Ekensholm Castle in Sweden.

Honours
  House of Habsburg: Dame of the Imperial and Royal Order of the Starry Cross, 1st Class
 : Dame of Honour and Devotion of the Sovereign Military Order of Malta

References and notes

External links

 Douglas Family Website
 Walburga Habsburg Douglas - Riksdag website

1958 births
Living people
Walburga
Walburga
Members of the Riksdag
Austrian Roman Catholics
Swedish people of Austrian descent
Swedish people of Croatian descent
Swedish people of German descent
Swedish people of Hungarian descent
Swedish countesses
Walburga
Articles containing video clips